Metti, una sera a cena (a.k.a. "Love Circle", literally "Let's Say, an Evening for Dinner") is a 1969 Italian drama film directed by Giuseppe Patroni Griffi. It was entered into the 1969 Cannes Film Festival.

Plot
Michel (Jean-Louis Trintignant) is a successful bourgeois playwright who fantasizes an affair between his beautiful wife, Nina (Florinda Bolkan), and his best friend, Max (Tony Musante), a bisexual actor. Unbeknownst to him, the pair have in fact been lovers for years, though Max is really in love with Michel. While Nina is occupied with Max, Michel drifts into an affair with a rich, but lonely, single woman (Annie Girardot). The four meet regularly for dinner at the home of Michel and Nina where they indulge in bored, amoral conversation.

As a diversion, Max suggests to Nina that they add a third player to their bedroom games: Ric (Lino Capolicchio), Max's anarchist/poet boyfriend who lives in a dankly luxurious basement and sells himself to both men and women. After a while, Ric finds himself falling in love with Nina and eventually attempts suicide over her. Nina discovers Ric in time to save him and decides to leave Michel to live with Ric. But soon their relationship withers and Nina returns to her husband. It's then that Michel decides to invite Ric into the circle, as they go on meeting at dinner and playing their games of love and seduction.

Cast
 Jean-Louis Trintignant as Michel
 Lino Capolicchio as Ric
 Tony Musante as Max
 Florinda Bolkan as Nina
 Annie Girardot as Giovanna
 Silvia Monti as Actress at Press Conference
 Milly as Singer
 Adriana Asti as Stepdaughter
 Titina Maselli as Mother
 Ferdinando Scarfiotti as Son
 Claudio Carrozza as Baby
 Nora Ricci as 1st Actress
 Mariano Rigillo as Comedian
 Antonio Jaia as Young Actor

References

External links

1969 films
1969 drama films
1960s Italian-language films
Italian drama films
Italian films based on plays
Films directed by Giuseppe Patroni Griffi
Films scored by Ennio Morricone
Films with screenplays by Dario Argento
Male bisexuality in film
1960s Italian films